Postcrania (postcranium, adjective: postcranial) in zoology and vertebrate paleontology is all or part of the skeleton apart from the skull.  Frequently, fossil remains, e.g. of dinosaurs or other extinct tetrapods, consist of partial or isolated skeletal elements; these are referred to as postcrania.

There is some disagreement over whether the skull and skeleton belong to the same or different animals. One example is the case of a Cretaceous sauropod skull of Nemegtosaurus found in association with the postcranial skeleton Opisthocoelicaudia. 

In paleoanthropological studies, reconstruction of relationship between various species/remains is considered to be better supported by cranial characters rather than postcranial characters. However, this assumption is largely untested.

Notes

Skeletal system